"What a Feeling" is a song by Italian DJ Alex Gaudino, taken from his second studio album Doctor Love (2013). The song features leading vocals from American singer Kelly Rowland. It was written by Gaudino, Giuseppe D'Albenzio, Emmanuel Mijares, Jenson Vaughan, Rowland and Joseph "Lonny" Bereal. "What a Feeling" was released from 22 March 2011 by Magnificent Records and Ultra Music (Universal Music).

Packaged with several remixes, upon release the single received positive reviews from critics. In Europe it peaked at top-forty in most countries, though notable it reached top-ten in the United Kingdom.

Background
"What a Feeling" is an up-tempo song. It features vocals from Kelly Rowland. It was written by Gaudino, Giuseppe D'Albenzio, Jenson Vaughan, Emmanuel Mijares, Rowland and Joseph "Lonny" Bereal. In an interview with the News of the Worlds Dan Wootton, Gaudino spoke of how amazing it was to work with Rowland on the song: "Kelly's an amazing artist, so down to earth, nice and fierce[...]Talking to [her] you feel on the same level whoever you are." Rowland replied, during an interview on the video shoot, to questions about what it was like working with Gaudino. She said "I'm so excited to be collaborating together for the first time. He is the nicest person and so talented."

Critical reception
The Daily Stars Kim Dawson called "What a Feeling" the biggest anthem from Rowland since her feature on the 2009 hit "When Love Takes Over" by David Guetta. Dawson added that "Already massive on dancefloors from Ibiza to Skegness, it's surely destined to become her third UK number one."

Loretta Charlton from Black Entertainment Television (BET) agreed, saying that "What a Feeling" "is a vibrant track that will draw many summer party people to the dance floor." Digital Spy's Robert Copsey praised Rowland's vocals on the song, calling them "emotionally-charged." Copsey also compared the song's marriage of its "pulsating synths and a vibrant piano hook" to the radio-friendly appeal of David Guetta and Rowland's 2009 hit collaboration, "When Love Takes Over." Copsey concluded his review by saying, "the result is yet another summery club cut built for club 18–30 dancefloors."

Music video
Directed by Frank Gatson Jr., the music video for the song was unveiled on 9 May 2011. It shows Rowland performing the track surrounded by dancers while Gaudino mixes the track in the audience.

Chart performance
On 11 June 2011 the single debuted at number 6 on the UK Singles Chart. The single became Rowland's seventh best selling solo single in the UK with 95,000 copies being sold as of November 2011.

Track listings

Belgian CD single
"What a Feeling" (Radio Version) – 2:58
"What a Feeling" (Extended Mix) – 6:39
"What a Feeling" (Nicky Romero Remix) – 7:07
"What a Feeling" (Hardwell Club Mix) – 7:34
"What a Feeling" (I'm Still in Love Club Mix) – 8:12

Italy CD single
"What a Feeling" (Radio Edit) – 2:58
"What a Feeling" (Extended Mix) – 6:39
"What a Feeling" (I'm Still in Love Club Mix) – 8:06
"What a Feeling" (Hardwell Remix) – 7:33
"What a Feeling" (Promise Land Remix) – 7:13
"What a Feeling" (Nicky Romero Remix) – 7:01
"What a Feeling" (HJM Remix) – 6:19
"What a Feeling" (Simiolli and Black Remix) – 5:48

German CD single
"What a Feeling" (Radio Edit) – 2:59
"What a Feeling" (Extended Mix) – 6:39

US digital download
"What a Feeling" (Radio Edit) – 2:58
"What a Feeling" (Extended Mix) – 6:39
"What a Feeling" (I'm Still in Love Club Mix) – 8:12

Digital EP
"What a Feeling" (Radio Edit)
"What a Feeling" (Extended Mix)
"What a Feeling" (Sunship Remix)
"What a Feeling" (Hardwell Club Mix)
"What a Feeling" (HJM Remix)
"What a Feeling" (I'm Still in Love Club Mix)

Credits and personnel
Recording information
"What a Feeling" was recorded at Magnificent Studios.
Personnel
Joseph "Lonny" Bereal – songwriter
Giuseppe D'Albenzio – songwriter
Alfonson "Alex" Gaudino – songwriter, producer, arranger, audio mixer
Emmanuel Mijares – songwriter
Kelly Rowland – songwriter, lead vocals
Jason Rooney – producer, arranger, mixer, pianist
Jenson Vaughan – songwriter

Charts

Weekly charts

Year-end charts

Sales

|}

Release history

References

2011 singles
2011 songs
Alex Gaudino songs
Kelly Rowland songs
Ministry of Sound singles
Songs written by Alex Gaudino
Songs written by Jenson Vaughan
Songs written by Kelly Rowland
Songs written by Lonny Bereal
Ultra Music singles